Connected is the first of three collaboration albums between rappers Lil' Flip and Mr. Capone-E.

Track listing 
 Where I Stay (Lil' Flip and Mr. Capone-E)
 On Da Block (Lil' Flip)
 Hustle For The Same Thing (Lil' Flip and Mr. Capone-E)
 Who Runs This {Lil' Flip) 
 King Of Da Streets (Lil Flip and Mr. Capone-E) 
 Gangster Trippen (Mr. Capone-E) 
 What You Know Bout The South (Lil' Flip) 
 Gangster Paradise (Mr. Capone-E) 
 Name Out Yo Mouth (Lil' Flip) 
 Still The King (Skit) (Lil' Flip) 
 Ride With a Gangsta (Lil' Flip) 
 Of a Soldier (Mr. Capone-E) 
 In H-Town (Lil' Flip) 
 You Know My Name (Mr. Capone-E) 
 Flat Out (Lil' Flip) 
 Show Tonite (Lil' Flip) 
 Get This Money (Lil' Flip} 
 Riden Dirty (Lil' Flip) 
 The Interview

References

2006 albums
Collaborative albums
Lil' Flip albums
Mr. Capone-E albums